Stefan Bliem (born 5 May 1983) is an Austrian professional association football player. He plays as a goalkeeper, and played between 2007 and 2013 for Mattersburg in the Austrian Bundesliga.

References

1983 births
Living people
Austrian footballers
Association football goalkeepers
SV Mattersburg players
Austrian Football Bundesliga players